Damian (also spelled Damien, Daymian, Daman, Damon, Daemon, Damion, Daymein, Damyean, Damiano, Demian, دامیان, Damião amongst others) is a given name that comes from Damianus, which is the latinisation of  the Greek name Δαμιανός (Damianos), derived from the Greek word δαμάζω (damazō), "(I) conquer, master, overcome, tame", in the form of δαμάω/-ῶ (damaō), a form assumed as the first person of δαμᾷ (damāi).

Historical names
Notable persons with the name include:   
Deruvian, sometimes called Damian, legendary 2nd-century bishop and saint
Damian of Ephesus, Greek rhetorician
Damian of Thessalonica, Greek physician
 Saints Cosmas and Damian (died c. 303), early Christian martyrs, patrons of physicians and surgeons
 Damian, two early Christian martyrs
 Coptic Pope Damian of Alexandria (died 605)
 Damianus (died 669), a bishop of Rochester, named after one of the above martyrs
 Damian of Pavia (d. 710), Bishop of Pavia and saint
 Damian of Tarsus (d. 924), Byzantine renegade and Muslim admiral
Pedro Damiano (1480–1544), a Portuguese chess player
Damian I of Jerusalem, Greek Orthodox Patriarch of Jerusalem from 1897 to 1931
 Saint Damien of Moloka'i (1840–1889), a Roman Catholic missionary to the leper colony on the Hawaiian island of Moloka'i, revered for his ministry that resulted in his own death from leprosy

Contemporary people

Arts
 Damian, full name Damian Gerard Baker (1964 - 2017), English pop musician and actor, known by his mononym Damian
 Damian Chapa (born 1962), American actor director star of Blood In Blood Out
 Damien Echols (born 1974), American author, one of three members of The West Memphis Three
 Damian Higgins (born 1972), real name of American DJ DieselBoy
 Damian Lewis (born 1971), English actor
 Damian Marley (born 1978), Grammy-winning reggae artist and son of Bob Marley
 Damian McGinty (born 1992), Irish singer and actor
 Damian O'Hare (born 1977), Northern-Irish actor
 Damian Smith, Australian ballet dancer
 Damian Woetzel (born 1967), New York City Ballet principal dancer, retired 2008

Others
 Damian Conway (born 1964), Australian computer science professor, author and prominent perl programmer
 Damián Escudero (born 1987), Argentine professional footballer
 Damián Furmanski (born 1975), Argentinean tennis player 
 Damian Green (born 1956), British politician
 Damian Lillard (born 1990), basketball player for the Portland Trail Blazers of the NBA
 Damian Mackle (born 1985), Northern-Irish professional wrestler, known professionally as Killian Dain
 Damian Martin (born 1984), Australian basketball player
 Damian Matthew (born 1970), English football manager
 Damian McBride, former special adviser to British Prime Minister Gordon Brown
 Damian Militaru (born 1967), Romanian footballer
 Damian Swann (born 1992), American football player
 Damian Wilson (born 1969), English musician, songwriter and vocalist

Fiction
 Damian Cray, character from the novel Eagle Strike by Anthony Horowitz
 Damian Desmond, a character from anime/manga series Spy × Family
 Damian Hart, a character from Beyblade: Metal Fight
 Damian Hayes, a character in Degrassi: The Next Generation
 Damian Wayne, a DC comics character, the son of Bruce Wayne (Batman) and Talia Al Ghul

See also
Damián
Damien (disambiguation)

References

Greek masculine given names
Romanian masculine given names